The Councils of Sens were a number of church councils hosted by the Archdiocese of Sens.

The first, around 600 or 601, in conformity with the instructions of pope St. Gregory the Great advised against simony. St. Columbanus refused to attend it because the question of the date of Easter (which was to be decided) was dividing Franks and Bretons.

A series of councils (most concerned with the privileges of the Abbey of St. Pierre-le-Vif) were held in 657, 669 (or 670), 846, 850, 852, 853, 862, 980, 986, 996, 1048, 1071 and 1080.

The council of 1140, according to the letter issued by Archbishop Henri Sanglier, seems to have had no object but to impart solemnity to the exposition of the relics with which he enriched the cathedral.  The chief work of this council (which included representatives from the Ecclesiastical provinces of Sens and Reims and at which Saint Bernard of Clairvaux assisted) was the condemnation of Abelard's doctrine. Abelard appealed from the council to Rome, but the bishops of both provinces insisted in two letters to Innocent II that the condemnation be confirmed. Martin Deutsch dates this council to 1141 but the Abbé Vacandard attempted to prove by the letter from Peter the Venerable to Héloïse, the "Continuatio Praemonstratensis", the "Continuatio Valcellensis" and the list of the priors of Clairvaux that Baronius' date (1140) is correct. However, Constant Mews has convincingly argued in a revised examination of all the available sources that it did in fact take place in 1141.

The council of 1198 was concerned with the Manichaean sect of Poplicani which had spread throughout the Nivernais region, to which the dean of Nevers and the Abbot of St-Martin de Nevers were said to have belonged. After the council, Pope Innocent III ordered his papal legate Peter of Capua and the Bishop of Paris Eudes de Sully to investigate.

A council was held in 1224 to condemn a book by Scotus Eriugena.

Councils were also held in 1216, 1239, 1252, 1253, 1269, 1280, 1315, 1320, 1460 and 1485 (most for disciplinary reasons).

A synod was held in March 1522, called by Francis I of France, to discuss the reformation of the church and of the church taxes, also published in the 1520 book Taxe cancellarie apostolice. It had no concrete outcome.

References

Sens